NA-204 Khairpur-III is a constituency for the National Assembly of Pakistan.

Election 2002 

General elections were held on 10 Oct 2002. Syed Fazal Ali Shah Jillani of PPP won by 54,388 votes.

Election 2008 

General elections were held on 18 Feb 2008. Syed Fazal Ali Shah Jillani of PPP won by 77,125 votes.

Election 2013 

General elections were held on 11 May 2013. Syed Kazim Ali Shah of PML-F won by 75,862 votes and became the  member of National Assembly.

Election 2018 

General elections are scheduled to be held on 25 July 2018.

See also
NA-203 Khairpur-II
NA-205 Naushahro Feroze-I

References

External links 
Election result's official website

NA-217